Midway Airlines was a United States airline based in Chicago, Illinois. It was founded on August 6, 1976, by investor Kenneth T. Carlson and joined by Irving T. Tague and William B. Owens on October 13, 1976, filing with the Civil Aeronautics Board (CA) for an airline operating certificate. Although it received its operating certificate from the CAB prior to the passage of the Airline Deregulation Act in 1978, it is widely recognized as the first post-deregulation start-up.  The airline commenced operations on October 31, 1979.

The airline was intended to breathe new life into Midway International Airport, then called Chicago Midway Airport, which had lost most of its scheduled flights to O'Hare International Airport. The airline took its name from this airport. Midway Airlines and the revitalized airport were advertised as a trouble-free alternative to O'Hare, and both of these spurred re-development and growth on Chicago's South Side. The airport was billed as a convenient ten- to fifteen-minute drive from downtown Chicago.

The airline went bankrupt in 1991 and was dissolved in 1992. A group of investors bought the airline's name and started a new separate company called Midway Airlines, which flew from 1993 to 2003.

History

Following the Airline Deregulation Act of 1978, Midway first emerged as a discount carrier. It was noted for its low fares and ease of connections at Midway Airport. The airline purchased three Douglas DC-9s from Trans World Airlines and began service on October 31, 1979, flying to Cleveland, Ohio's Cleveland Burke Lakefront Airport, Kansas City, Missouri, and Detroit, Michigan. The scheduled service was an instant success. In 1980, Midway bought five more DC-9s and added flights to St. Louis, Missouri, New York City's La Guardia Airport, and Washington National Airport in Arlington, Virginia, outside Washington, D.C.; it also shifted its Cleveland service to Cleveland Hopkins International Airport. The airline also briefly served Minneapolis, Minnesota, but dropped this service shortly after it began.

During the 1980s, the airline adopted a combination of all-leather two-by-two seating to business markets and all-coach seating to vacation destinations. It eventually dropped this idea due to the impact on revenue caused by eliminating seats, and the confusion it created in the minds of connecting passengers.

The carrier expanded into the Caribbean via the purchase in 1984 of the assets of Air Florida, which had gone into bankruptcy. It proved to be good mix of business and vacation travel revenue. Midway flourished under the leadership of David R. Hinson, who was its chief executive officer from 1985 to 1991.  In 1984, Boeing 737-200 flights to the Caribbean were being operated by subsidiary Midway Express while DC-9 domestic jet service was flown Midway Metrolink.

In 1986 the company assisted in setting up a successful regional affiliate, Midway Connection, as a feeder operating commuter turboprop aircraft with service to small communities in Illinois, Indiana, Wisconsin, and Michigan. This carrier was established following the bankruptcy of Chicago Air, a regional carrier which attempted a similar, but independent, feeder operation earlier in 1986.

On a June 1988 weekday, Midway scheduled 116 nonstop flights into Midway Airport from 25 airports, along with 75 Midway Connection nonstops from 17 other airports. They flew Chicago Midway (MDW) - Miami (MIA) - Saint Croix (STX) - St. Thomas (STT)  round trip as well as Chicago Midway (MDW) - Fort Lauderdale (FLL) - Nassau (NAS) round trip ; aside from those, all Chicago  flights were nonstop to and from Midway Airport. Midway Airlines′ peak year was 1989, when it flew 10.1 billion revenue passenger-kilometers, compared to 0.6 billion in 1981.

Midway Airlines was noted for friendly employees and attentive service, and its Chicago South Side passengers were fiercely loyal to their hometown airline. Some of the signature in-flight service items were after-dinner chocolate wafer mints and hot hand towels for the entire cabin, both of which had originally caught on with Midway's business clientele.

In June 1989, Midway Airlines agreed to purchase a hub operation at Philadelphia International Airport in Philadelphia, Pennsylvania, for $100 million along with $100 million worth of DC-9 jets from the bankrupt Eastern Air Lines. The company began hub operations in Philadelphia in November 1989. However, less than a year later, competition with the US Airways Philadelphia hub, coupled with rising jet fuel prices following the August 1990 IraqI invasion of Kuwait, caused the company to quit its Philadelphia hub. In October 1990 it sold its Philadelphia assets to USAir for $67.5 million.

Citing the high price of jet fuel during the 1991 Gulf War and a drop in passengers in the recession that followed, the airline filed Chapter 11 in March 1991. In reorganization, Midway attempted to sell itself to Northwest Airlines. Northwest pulled out of negotiations on November 12, 1991, however, and Midway ceased operations the next day. Its bankruptcy was re-filed as a liquidation under Chapter 7 bankruptcy laws.

The airline was dissolved in 1992. A group of investors bought the Midway Airlines name and started a new airline using the name in 1993. That airline went bankrupt in 2003.

Destinations
Canada
 Montreal (Montréal-Dorval International Airport)
 Toronto (Toronto Pearson International Airport)

Caribbean
 Nassau (Lynden Pindling International Airport)
 St. Croix (Henry E. Rohlsen Airport)
 St. Thomas (Cyril E. King Airport)

United States
 Albany (Albany International Airport)
 Atlanta (Hartsfield–Jackson Atlanta International Airport)
 Boston (Logan International Airport)
 Chicago (Chicago Midway International Airport) - Hub
 Cincinnati/Northern Kentucky (Cincinnati/Northern Kentucky International Airport)
 Cleveland (Cleveland Burke Lakefront Airport)
 Cleveland (Cleveland Hopkins International Airport)
 Columbus (Port Columbus International Airport)
 Dallas/Fort Worth (Dallas/Fort Worth International Airport)
 Denver (Stapleton International Airport)
 Des Moines (Des Moines International Airport)
 Detroit (Detroit Metropolitan Wayne County Airport)
 Fort Lauderdale/Hollywood (Fort Lauderdale – Hollywood International Airport)
 Fort Myers (Southwest Florida International Airport)
 Hartford (Bradley International Airport)
 Indianapolis (Indianapolis International Airport)
 Jacksonville (Jacksonville International Airport)
 Kansas City (Kansas City International Airport)
 Las Vegas (McCarran International Airport)
 Lincoln (Lincoln Airport (Nebraska)
 Los Angeles (Los Angeles International Airport)
 Louisville (Louisville International Airport)
 Memphis (Memphis International Airport)
 Miami (Miami International Airport)
 Minneapolis/St. Paul (Minneapolis-Saint Paul International Airport)
 New Orleans (Louis Armstrong New Orleans International Airport)
 New York City (LaGuardia Airport)
 Omaha (Eppley Airfield)
 Orange County (John Wayne Airport)
 Orlando (Orlando International Airport)
 Philadelphia (Philadelphia International Airport)
 Phoenix (Phoenix Sky Harbor International Airport)
 Pittsburgh (Pittsburgh International Airport)
 Providence (T. F. Green Airport)
 Sarasota/Bradenton (Sarasota-Bradenton International Airport)
 St. Louis (Lambert-St. Louis International Airport)
 St. Petersburg/Clearwater (St. Petersburg-Clearwater International Airport)
 Tampa (Tampa International Airport)
 Washington, D.C. (Washington National Airport)
 West Lafayette, Indiana (Purdue University Airport)
 West Palm Beach (Palm Beach International Airport)

Fleet

Midway Metrolink
From 1983 to 1985 Midway experimented with a one-class business service called "Midway Metrolink" on some of its flights. Seating was 2x2 on DC-9s, which typically have 2x3 seating.

Midway Express
After its initial acquisition of Air Florida, Midway Airlines operated a stand-alone service named "Midway Express", which flew some of Air Florida's former tourist routes.  In 1984, Midway Express was serving four airports in Florida, including Ft. Lauderdale, Miami, Orlando and West Palm Beach as well as St. Thomas and St. Croix in the Caribbean. The airline initially operated Boeing 737-200 jets which had been formerly operated by Air Florida. By 1990, Midway had added service to Fort Myers, Jacksonville and Sarasota in Florida as well as to Nassau and Freeport in the Bahamas.

Midway Connection
In 1987 Midway Airlines purchased commuter air carrier Fischer Brothers Aviation based in Galion, Ohio, and moved the entire operation to Springfield, Illinois.  Fischer Brothers Aviation had previously operated Allegheny Commuter service for Allegheny Airlines and successor USAir and then began operating Northwest Airlink service on behalf of Northwest Airlines.  The initial move consisted of the Fischer Brothers management team (including Vice President of Operations Armando Cardenas, Chief Pilot Mark Zweidinger, Vice President of Customer Service Mark Fisher, Director of Maintenance Craig Anderson and Personnel Manager Cynthia Baldwin) and was led by Midway Airlines executive Richard Pfennig. Offers of employment were extended to the pilots and maintenance team that wanted to relocate.  Gordon Jones, Vice President of Maintenance and Jerry Turpstra, Chief Inspector joined the management group in June 1987.  Mr. Pfennig took control of the operation and was able to quickly get the company through certification flights. In May 1987 the commuter started scheduled passenger flights.  The initial operation consisted of 21 employees, the original seven Dornier 228 turboprop aircraft and eventually ended with 125 employees, 28 Dornier aircraft and 13 Embraer EMB-120 Brasilia turboprop aircraft.  Midway Connection operated to cities in the Midwest states, including Wisconsin (Milwaukee, Madison, Green Bay, Oshkosh), Michigan (Traverse City, Grand Rapids, Muskegeon, Lansing, Kalamazoo), Indiana (South Bend, Ft. Wayne, Indianapolis, Lafayette), Illinois (Bloomington, Champaign, Moline-Quad Cities, Peoria and their home base Springfield, Illinois), and Ohio (Toledo).  This Midway Connection service was a wholly owned subsidiary of Midway Airlines, and although it was an independent operation, it was completely operated as a "feeder" for the "mainline" operation via a code sharing agreement.  Dispatch and Maintenance for the airline was conducted in Springfield, Illinois, while reservations were supported through Midway Airlines in Chicago utilizing the SABRE reservations system.

Iowa Airways
Iowa Airways also operated Midway Connection code share service and in 1989 was flying nonstop between Midway Airport and Benton Harbor, Flint, and Kalamazoo in Michigan, Dubuque in Iowa and Elkhart in Indiana with Embraer EMB-110 Bandeirante turboprops.

Accidents and incidents

Midway Airlines had no aircraft accidents.

Midway Connection had only 3 minor incidents and 2 large bird strike incidents.
During initial FAA flight proving runs, a cabin door on the Dornier 228 aircraft opened in flight and struck the tail of the aircraft. The aircraft sustained minor damage and returned to Springfield, Illinois. The door was found in a field later that month.

During a passenger flight, a repair of the previous tail damage came loose inflight and departed the aircraft. The damage was found during inspection by the first officer for the next flight.
During engine start up procedures, a parking brake was left engaged on a Dornier 228 aircraft. The FAA determined that braking pressure had bled out from one of the main landing gear brakes. The over-riding parking brake valve prohibited the pilot from being able to actuate the pilot brakes causing the aircraft to yaw and strike one of the other nearby parked aircraft.

Midway Connection had two bird strike incidents involving geese. The first incident involved a goose striking the inner wing between the engine and the fuselage.  During the incident the bird was also struck by the propeller and a portion of the carcass was thrown through the passenger window striking a passenger. The second involved a goose striking one of the landing gear sponsons causing substantial damage to the fairing and structure.

Frequent flyer program
Midway operated a frequent flyer program called FlyersFirst. Upon cessation of service, the program ended and mileage credits were not transferred to any other program.

See also 
 List of defunct airlines of the United States

References

External links

routemapsonline.com has several Midway timetables and route maps including timetable of routes purchased from Eastern Airlines.

Airlines established in 1976
Airlines disestablished in 1991
Companies that have filed for Chapter 7 bankruptcy
Companies that filed for Chapter 11 bankruptcy in 1991
Defunct airlines of the United States
Defunct companies based in Chicago
1976 establishments in Illinois